Chong Nonsi station is a BTS skytrain station, on the Silom line in Bang Rak District, Bangkok, Thailand. The station is located on Naradhiwas Rajanagarindra Road over Chong Non Si canal, in the heart of Bangkok business area between Sathon and Si Lom Roads.

Nearby landmarks 

 King Power Mahanakhon
 Empire Tower (Bangkok)
 Chong Nonsi Canal Park

Facilities
 Sky Walk to Sathorn BRT station of Bangkok BRT

See also
 BTS Skytrain
 Bangkok BRT

References

BTS Skytrain stations